Edison Lighthouse are an English pop band, formed in London in 1969. The band was best known for their 1970 hit single "Love Grows (Where My Rosemary Goes)" recorded in late 1969.

Career
Before the name Edison Lighthouse, they were known as the soft rock band Greenfield Hammer, gigging on the home counties circuit.
The original line-up of Edison Lighthouse consisted of Tony Burrows (lead vocalist), Stuart Edwards (lead guitar), David Taylor (bass guitar), George Weyman (drums), and Ray Dorey (guitar). The group's top 40 hit "Love Grows (Where My Rosemary Goes)" (1970) was one of four near-concurrent UK Singles Chart top ten hit singles that Burrows released under different names. The other songs were "Gimme Dat Ding" (the Pipkins), "My Baby Loves Lovin" (White Plains), and "United We Stand" (Brotherhood of Man). Burrows was also lead vocalist on the single "Beach Baby" (1974) for another studio-only group, the First Class.

"Love Grows (Where My Rosemary Goes)" was No. 1 for five weeks and sold 250,000 copies in the UK. It reached the top of the chart in its second week. The United States release was in February 1970 and reached No. 5 on the Billboard Hot 100, selling a million copies there by April and earning an RIAA gold disc. In Canada, the song reached No. 3.

Burrows left after "Love Grows", and Tony Macaulay (who owned the rights to the name Edison Lighthouse) brought in other musicians. Actor and singer Paul Vigrass replaced Burrows. Other members included David Kerr-Clemenson (bass guitar) of Warehorne, Andy Locke (vocals, guitar), Eddie Richards (drums), Wally Scott (guitar) and Ken Reeves (vocals).

The band's song "It's Up to You Petula" reached the UK top 50. Their next single, "What's Happening?" coupled with "Take a Little Time", was written by the band. They then went on to tour Australia, New Zealand, Singapore, Malaysia and Africa. The single released for the Africa tour was "Reconsider My Belinda". The last single released was "Find Mr. Zebedee". The band then called it a day after returning from a tour of Europe.

Continuation of Edison Lighthouse
Dave Kerr-Clemenson, after touring with White Plains and Andy Locke, went on to form Fast Buck, recorded an album with Jet Records, and toured the world extensively supporting ELO. Eddie Richards was the drummer in The First Class who had a hit with "Beach Baby". Guitarist Stuart Edwards died on 26 October 2016 from cancer at the age of 73.

In 1973 Brian Huggins and Peter Butt, of the band Crush, were approached by their management to takeover the touring of Scandinavia as Edison Lighthouse. Brian Huggins acquired the rights to the name Edison Lighthouse in 1974. Huggins has been fronting the band ever since. The current Edison Lighthouse line-up is as follows:

 Brian Huggins − lead vocals (1973–present)
 Peter Butt − bass guitar (1973–present)
 Mark Forton − drums (2020–present)
 Rick Piggott  − lead guitar (2022–present)

 Matthew Bason – keyboards (2022-present)

Origin of the name
Edison Lighthouse was named after the Eddystone Lighthouse off the coast of Devon. The band later briefly dropped the Lighthouse and became just Edison, although the original name was later reinstated.

Discography

Studio albums
 Already (1971, Bell Records, Sweden)
 Love Grows (1977, SMA, UK)

Live albums
 Then There Where Two (2003, self-release, UK)

Compilation albums
 Love Grows (CD, ACD, Austria)
 Edison Lighthouse (1990 Cassette/CD, Object Enterprises, UK)
 Love Grows: Complete Collection Featuring Tony Burrows (1994 CD, Sunflower, Italy)
 The Best of Edison Lighthouse - Love Grows (1999 CD, Repertoire Records, Germany)
 Love Grows with Edison Lighthouse (2002 CD, The Westminster Recording Co., UK)
 On the Rocks (2002 CD, Park South, US)
 Edison Lighthouse Selected Favorites (2006 Digital Download, Charly Records, US)
 Their Very Best (2009 Digital Download, K-tel, US)
 Barbara Ann (2010 Digital Download, One Media Publishing, US)
 Showing the Way  (The Dave Cash Collection) (2011 Digital Download, One Media Publishing, US)
 The Dave Cash Collection: Light My House (2011 Digital Download, One Media Publishing, US)

Singles

See also
 List of artists who reached number one on the UK Singles Chart
 List of UK Singles Chart number ones of the 1970s
 List of performers on Top of the Pops
 List of one-hit wonders in the United States
 List of 1970s one-hit wonders in the United States
 List of number-one singles of 1970 (Ireland)
 List of Top 25 singles for 1970 in Australia

References

External links
 Official website

English pop music groups
British soft rock music groups
Musical groups established in 1969
Musical groups from London
Bell Records artists
Bubblegum pop groups